The 2006 Rushmoor Council election took place on 4 May 2006 to elect members of Rushmoor Borough Council in Hampshire, England. One third of the council was up for election and the Conservative Party stayed in overall control of the council.

After the election, the composition of the council was:
Conservative 25
Liberal Democrat 10
Labour 5
Independent 2

Campaign
Before the election the council had 22 Conservative, 11 Liberal Democrat, 5 Labour and 3 independent councillors. In total 52 candidates were standing in the election with 14 seats being contested. These candidates came from the Conservatives, Liberal Democrats, Labour, British National Party, Green Party, Official Monster Raving Loony Party and 1 independent.

Issues in the election included anti-social behaviour, regeneration of Aldershot, services for young people, traffic management and the environment. The 3 candidates from the British National Party also caused controversy in the election after they distributed leaflets in Farnborough containing pictures of Mohammad as a suicide bomber.

The election had Rushmoor be one of a few councils trialing early voting in an attempt to increase turnout. Polling stations were open in the week leading up to the election in Aldershot and Farnborough, as well as one in Aldershot Military Town. Turnout in the election as a whole was 36%, up 5% on the 2003 election with over 1,200 peoples using the 2 early polling stations in Aldershot and Farnborough town centres. However the polling station in the military town, open on the day before the election, got only 46 votes cast.

Election result
The results saw the Conservatives increase their majority after gaining 3 seats to hold 25 of the 42 seats. The Conservatives gained two seats from the Liberal Democrats and 
one seat in Knellwood, where the previous independent councillor, Patrick Kirby, stepped down at the election. The gains from the Liberal Democrats came in Cove and Southwood ward where the Conservatives won by 310 votes, and West Heath where the margin was much closer at only 13 votes. These defeats meant the Liberal Democrats were reduced to 10 seats on the council, compared to 5 for Labour and 2 independents.

Labour held both of the seats they had been defending with the result in Heron Wood being closest with Labour holding on by 108 votes. The British National Party saw an increased vote, with the party winning 20% in Mayfield, just 28 votes short of second place. Meanwhile, the candidate from the Official Monster Raving Loony Party, whose policies had included a pledge to make people buy £90 worth of Smarties each week, won 59 votes in Rowhill ward.

Ward results

References

2006
2006 English local elections
2000s in Hampshire